Frank Sheridan (May 1, 1898 – April 15, 1962) was an American classical pianist.

References 

1898 births
1962 deaths
20th-century American pianists
20th-century classical pianists
American classical pianists
American male classical pianists
Classical musicians from New York (state)